Kreuzau is a municipality in the district of Düren in the state of North Rhine-Westphalia, Germany. It is located on the river Rur, approx. 5 km south of Düren.

Geography

Neighbouring communities 
Kreuzau is surrounded by the following settlements, listed clockwise beginning in the north: the county town of Düren and the municipalities of Nörvenich, Vettweiß, Nideggen and Hürtgenwald, all in the county of Düren.

Municipal subdivisions 
The municipality Kreuzau includes the following civil parishes (Ortsteil):
 Bogheim
 Boich
 Drove
 Kreuzau (incl. Schneidhausen) with 5,150 inhabitants on 31 October 2015
 Leversbach
 Obermaubach (incl. Schlagstein)
 Stockheim
 Thum
 Üdingen
 Untermaubach (incl. Bilstein)
 Winden (incl. Bergheim and Langenbroich)

In addition there was the now extinct village of Hemgenberg.

Twin towns
Kreuzau is twinned with:

  Obervellach, Austria
  Plancoët, France

References

Düren (district)